Mehrpadin Castle (Persian: قلعه مهرپادین) is a 14th century castle in Mehriz County, Yazd Province, Iran.

History 
There is a disagreement on when this castle was constructed. According to some, it was built during Mozaffarid era, others claim it is a Safavid structure, while another group attribute it to Afsharid era.

The local story, however, states that during the Mongol invasion, the Mongols slaughtered the entire population of the city of Mehrijerd, but spared one infant boy and gave him to the inhabitants of the nearby village of Saryazd. When the boy grew up, in order to prevent this from happening ever again, he returned to his homeland and created the castle, so that people would be safe in times of raids and wars.

The castle was never used as a permanent residence, but as a place for temporary residence in event of raids, in which case they often used smoke to signal other castles and ask for help.

It was listed in the national heritage sites of Iran with the number 6,143 on 29 September 2002.

Description 
The castle consists of two layers of walls and nine round towers, and the entire castle is surrounded by a large moat. Interior of the castle includes structures like houses, governor's seat, religious buildings, stables and storehouses.

Gallery

References 

Castles in Iran
Tourist attractions in Yazd Province
Buildings and structures in Yazd Province
National works of Iran